Ludwig van Beethoven's Piano Sonata No. 26 in E major, Op. 81a, known as Les Adieux ("The Farewell"), was written during the years 1809 and 1810.

The title  implies a programmatic nature. The French attack on Vienna, led by Napoléon Bonaparte in 1809, forced Beethoven's patron, Archduke Rudolph, to leave the city. Yet, there is some uncertainty about this nature of the piece — or at least, about the degree to which Beethoven wished this programmatic nature should be known. He titled the three movements "", "", and "" ('farewell', 'absence', and 'reunion'), and reportedly regarded the French "" (said to whole assemblies or cities) as a poor translation of the feeling of the German "" (said heartfully to a single person). Indeed, Beethoven wrote the syllables "" over the first three chords.

On the first 1811 publication, a dedication was added reading "On the departure of his Imperial Highness, for the Archduke Rudolph in admiration".

An average performance of the piece lasts about 17 minutes. The sonata is one of Beethoven's most challenging sonatas because of the mature emotions that must be conveyed throughout as well as the technical difficulties involved. It is also the bridge between his middle period and his later period and is considered the third great sonata of the middle period.

Form
The three movements of Les Adieux were originally written in German and French, and the last two movements are described in German because of the unusual tempo. The translation in English shown in italic as below:

I. Das Lebewohl

The sonata opens in a  time  Adagio with a short, simple motif of three chords, at first forming an interrupted cadence, over which are written the three syllables Le-be-wohl ("Fare-thee-well"). This motif is the basis upon which both the first and the second subject groups are drawn.

The first movement oscillates between a turbulent first subject which portrays deep disturbance and a second subject which is more lyrical in nature and gives the impression of reflections. The rhythmic figure of two short notes and a longer note which is used repeatedly in the first subject is developed inexorably through the "development" section with rich harmonies and discords which are harmonically closer to the later period of Beethoven's compositions than the middle for their intellectual penetration.

The movement has a surprisingly long coda which occupies over a quarter of the movement's length. The coda encompasses both the subjects in a display of powerful mastery over  composition. Typically the movement played with the expected repeats lasts a little over 7 minutes.

II. Abwesenheit

The Andante espressivo is harmonically built on variations of the diminished chord and the appoggiatura. The movement is very emotional and is often played with rubato that would be found in later composers such as Robert Schumann and Johannes Brahms. Much of the subject matter is rhythmically repeated consecutively as well as sectionally, perhaps to emphasise the feelings of uncomfortable solitude and fear of no return. The arrival of the dominant seventh chord at the end of movement signals the return to the tonic key, but remains unresolved until the triumphant appearance of the main theme in the final movement (which begins attacca). Typically the movement lasts just under 4 minutes.

III. Das Wiedersehen

The finale, also in sonata form, starts joyfully on a B dominant 7th chord, in  time. After the startling introduction, the first subject shows up in the right hand and is immediately transferred to the left hand, which is repeated twice with an elaboration of the arrangement in the right hand. Before the second subject group arrives, there is one remarkable bridge passage, introducing a phrase that goes from G major to F major chords, first through distinctive forte arpeggios, then in a more delicate, fine piano arrangement.

References

Sources
 Kolodin, Irving (1975). The Interior Beethoven. New York: Alfred A. Knopf. .

External links
 A lecture by András Schiff on Beethoven's piano sonata Op. 81a
 
 
 Recording by Paavali Jumppanen, piano from the Isabella Stewart Gardner Museum

Articles
 Sonate für Klavier (Es-Dur) Op. 81a (www.beethoven-haus-bonn.de)
 Sonate Characterisque (Op. 81) Analysis and commentary by Frederic Horace Clark - Music (Volume 15: Nov. 1898 to Apr. 1899) edited by W.S.B. Mathews; published by Music Magazine Publishing Company

Piano Sonata 26
1810 compositions
Compositions in E-flat major
Music with dedications